Marie-Juliette Olga "Lili" Boulanger (21 August 189315 March 1918) was a French composer and the first female winner of the Prix de Rome composition prize. Her older sister was the noted composer and composition teacher Nadia Boulanger.

Biography

Early years 

As a Parisian-born child prodigy, Boulanger's talent was apparent at a very young age; at the age of two, she was already singing melodies by ear. Her parents, both of whom were musicians, encouraged their daughter's musical education. Her mother, Raissa Myshetskaya (Mischetzky), was a Russian princess who married her Paris Conservatoire teacher, Ernest Boulanger (1815–1900), who won the Prix de Rome in 1835.  Her father was 77 years old when she was born and she became very attached to him. Her grandfather Frédéric Boulanger had been a noted cellist and her grandmother Juliette a singer.

Boulanger accompanied her ten-year-old sister Nadia to classes at the Paris Conservatoire before she was five, shortly thereafter sitting in on classes on music theory and studying organ with Louis Vierne. She also sang and played piano, violin, cello and harp. Her teachers included Marcel Tournier and Alphonse Hasselmans for harp, Mme Hélène Chaumont for piano and Fernand Luquin for violin.

Career
In 1912, Boulanger competed in the Prix de Rome but during her performance she collapsed from illness. She returned in 1913 at the age of 19 to win the composition prize for her cantata Faust et Hélène, becoming the first woman to win the prize. The text was written by Eugene Adenis based on Goethe's Faust. The cantata had many performances during her lifetime. Because of the prize, she gained a contract with the publisher Ricordi.

Nadia Boulanger had given up entering the Prix de Rome after four unsuccessful attempts and focused her attention on her role as assistant in Henri Dallier's organ class at the Conservatoire, where Lili studied harmony, counterpoint and composition with Paul Vidal and Georges Caussade, under the Conservatoire's Director Gabriel Fauré—the last of whom was greatly impressed by her talents and frequently brought songs for her to read. Boulanger was greatly affected by the 1900 death of her father; many of her works touch on themes of grief and loss. Her work was noted for its colorful harmony and instrumentation and skillful text setting. Aspects of Fauré and Claude Debussy can be heard in her compositions, and Arthur Honegger was influenced by her innovative work.

According to Caroline Potter, “The two sisters were both influenced by Debussy, and it appears they had similar literary tastes to the elder composer. Both sisters set poems by Maurice Maeterlinck, who was the author of the play Pelléas and Mélisande and also of Princesse Maleine; in February 1916, Maeterlinck authorized Lili to set the latter play as an opera. Allegedly, Lili had almost completed the opera before her death, though only the short score of act 1, scene 2, two versions of the libretto, and a sketchbook have survived."

Illness and death 
She suffered from chronic illness, beginning with a case of bronchial pneumonia at age two that weakened her immune system, leading to the intestinal tuberculosis that ended her life at the age of 24. Although she loved to travel and completed several works in Italy after winning the Prix de Rome, her failing health forced her to return home, where she and her sister organised efforts to support French soldiers during World War I. Her last years were a productive time musically as she labored to complete works. Her death left unfinished the opera La princesse Maleine on which she had spent most of her last years.

Boulanger died in Mézy-sur-Seine and was buried in a tomb in the Cimetière de Montmartre, located in the southwest corner of section 33 close to the intersection of Avenue Saint-Charles and Chemin Billaud. In 1979, her sister Nadia Boulanger was buried in the same tomb. It also contains the remains of their parents.

Music 
Boulanger grew up in a time of musical transition and her music fits easily into what was becoming defined as a post-Romantic style. Like Debussy, Boulanger associated herself more with Symbolism than Impressionism, with her music featuring the sense of obscurity and indirection more common in Symbolism. However, she also “explored the ‘Impressionists’ palette of nonfunctional seventh and ninth chords, parallel chords, and modal progressions.”. While much of Boulanger’s music reflects the feelings of isolation and alienation that were starting to emerge during the twentieth century, it also reveals her own struggles with depression and loneliness caused by her long-term illness. She often chose texts that conveyed a strong sense of hopelessness and sadness, as seen in Demain fera un an: “Nothing more. I have nothing more, nothing to sustain me” and “I seem to feel a weeping within me, a heavy, silent sobbing, someone who is not there”.

Works

Les sirènes 

Les sirènes (1911) is written for solo soprano and three part choir. The topic, mermaids, uses a text by Charles Grandmougin. This work was first premiered at one of her mother's exclusive musical gatherings. Auguste Mangeot, a critic from the Paris music journal Le Monde Musicale, reported that everyone liked the piece so well it had to be repeated. Boulanger used this piece as a preparation for the Prix de Rome competition, and from it one can see her firm grounding in the classical technique taught at the Conservatoire. She uses this technique as a starting point and employs many devices popular at that time to create a personal and clear statement.

The poetry of this selection deals with the mythological siren, a creature that sings to seduce sailors to steer closer; when they do, the sirens devour the men. Boulanger depicts this scene as vividly as she possibly can. She uses a pedal tone on F combined with ascending C octaves at the beginning to portray the mesmerizing effect of the sirens. She uses this effect for twenty-eight measures, in effect, lulling listeners into a trance-like sleep.

The work is dedicated to Madame Jane Engel Bathori. Bathori, a soprano, was known for her concert organisation, and supported many new artists and composers.

Psalms 

Boulanger composed three psalm settings: Psalms 24, 129 and 130.

Psalm 24 
She composed Psalm 24, entitled La terre appartient à l'Eternel ("The earth is the Lord's"), in 1916 while she was resident in Rome. The work is dedicated to Monsieur Jules Griset, who was the director of Choral Guillot de Saint-Brice. Durand published the work in 1924. The work is scored for choir (consisting of soprano, alto, tenor and bass), accompanied by organ and brass ensemble (consisting of 4 horns, 3 trumpets, 4 trombones, 1 tuba), timpani and 2 harps. Boulanger's score uses brass fanfares and homophonic choral passages: the contrast of sections contrast to the style of her 1912 Prix de Rome winning cantata, Faust et Hélène, as heard in Yan Pascal Tortelier's recording.

Psalm 129 
Psalm 129 was also composed in 1916 in Rome. This psalm is much longer than Psalm 24 and is composed for full orchestra. The premiere performance was held at the Salle Pleyel in 1921, conducted by Henri Busser.

Psalm 130 
Du fond de l'abîme (Psalm 130: De Profundis / "Out of the depths"), composed for voice and orchestra, is dedicated to the memory of her father, as noted at the top of the score. The work, completed when Boulanger was aged only twenty-two, sounds mature and conveys a developed compositional style. Boulanger's psalms convey her Catholic faith. It has been suggested that the work was composed in reaction to World War I. The work is for a large orchestra including a sarrusophone.

Pie Jesu 
Lili Boulanger finished this Pie Jesu (1918) towards the end of her life, but "the first of Lili Boulanger's sketches for the Pie Jesu are to be found in a composition book she used between 1909 and 1913." As noted by her sister, Nadia, she dictated the work to her. Scholars such as biographer Léonie Rosenstiel and Olivia Mattis speculate that Boulanger intended to write a complete Requiem Mass but did not live to complete it. Scored for high voice, string quartet, harp and organ, Boulanger's setting is sparse. Pie Jesu is the only surviving Boulanger text setting that uses an explicitly Christian text.

Vieille prière bouddhique 
This work, "Old Buddhist Prayer", is written for tenor and chorus (soprano, alto, tenor and bass), accompanied by a large orchestra consisting of: 2 flutes, 2 oboes, English horn, 2 clarinets (B♭), bass clarinet (B♭), 2 bassoons, sarrusophone + 4 horns (F), 3 trumpets, 4 trombones, tuba + tympani, cymbals, bass drum + celesta + 2 harps, strings. Composed during 1914–1917, as many of her works, it was not performed until after World War I, in 1921. This work is not based within Catholicism, as her psalms were. Rather, it sets a Buddhist daily prayer. James Briscoe notes that this work shows similarities to Stravinsky but also to the next generation.

D'un soir triste 
This symphonic poem was the last work Boulanger was able to compose by her own hand, without help in writing.

D'un matin de printemps 

This instrumental work is one of the last pieces Lili Boulanger completed. Different arrangements were produced including a version for violin, for flute, and for piano, another for piano trio, and another for orchestra. Although she finished both these instrumental works, her sister Nadia reportedly edited the works to add dynamics and performance directions.

List by year

Legacy

In March 1939, Nadia Boulanger with the help of American friends created the Lili Boulanger Memorial Fund. It has two objectives: to perpetuate Lili Boulanger's music and memory and to financially support talented musicians. The Lili Boulanger Memorial Fund does not accept applications for its annual competition but a list of candidates is produced by a group of nominators selected each year by the Board of Trustees. Each nominator can then propose a candidate for the prize. The Fund then awards the Prix Lili Boulanger to one of these candidates. The University of Massachusetts Boston curates the fund. Previous winners have included Alexei Haieff (1942), Noël Lee (1953), Wojciech Kilar (1960), Robert D. Levin (1966, 1971) and Andy Akiho (2015).

In April 1965, the Friends of Lili Boulanger Association was created in Paris. This organization became the Nadia and Lili Boulanger International Centre (CNLB) in 2009.

Joy-Leilani Garbutt and Laura Colgate, two Washington, DC, musicians, started the Boulanger Initiative in 2018 to support music composed by women, in honor of Lili and Nadia Boulanger.

The asteroid 1181 Lilith was named in honour of Boulanger.

The two definitive biographies are The Life and Works of Lili Boulanger by the American musicologist Léonie Rosenstiel and À la recherche de Lili Boulanger by French musicologist and tenor Jérôme Spycket.

Notes

References

External links

1893 births
1918 deaths
20th-century classical composers
Burials at Montmartre Cemetery
French classical composers
French women classical composers
French people of Russian descent
Musicians from Paris
Prix de Rome for composition
20th-century French women musicians
Deaths from Crohn's disease
20th-century French composers
Impressionist composers
French Catholics
20th-century women composers
20th-century deaths from tuberculosis
Tuberculosis deaths in France